Zhongshan District is a district in Keelung, Taiwan.

Administrative divisions

The district administers 24 urban villages:
 Xinjian/Sinjian, Anmin, Anping, Zhongshan/Jhongshan, Minzhi/Minjhih, Zhongxing/Jhongsing, Renzheng/Renjheng, Jianmin, Tonghua, Juren/Jyuren, Tongming, Xiehe/Siehe, Wenhua/Wunhua, Xiandong/Siandong, Taibai, Xirong/Sirong, Xihua/Sihua, Xiding/Siding, Xikang/Sikang, Dehe, Zhonghe/Jhonghe, Dean/De-an/De'an, Heping, Heqing/Hecing

Government
 Civil affairs division
 Social affairs division
 Economic construction division
 Military service division
 Mediation committee

Education
 Ching Kuo Institute of Management and Health
 Keelung Fu Jen Sacred Heart Senior High School

Tourist attractions
 Baimiweng Fort
 Cave of Buddha's Hand
 Huzishan Keelung Landmark
 Keelung Lighthouse
 Lake Coastal Boulevard
 Memorial for Labors Died during Keelung Port Construction
 Neimushan
 Quizishan Lighhouse
 Waimushan Seaside Scenic Area
 Waimushan Fishing Harbor
 Xian Dong Yan

Infrastructure
 Hsieh-ho Power Plant

Transportation
The district is accessible from Keelung Station of the Taiwan Railways.

Provincial Highways 2 and 2F (Which connects to Freeway 3), run through the district.

See also
 Keelung

References

Districts of Keelung